Mischodon is a genus in the family Picrodendraceae, described in 1854. The only known species is Mischodon zeylanicus, a tree native to southern India, Sri Lanka, and the Andaman Islands.

Common names
 Sinhala - Tammanna (තම්මැන්න) 
 Tamil - Tampanai

See also
Taxonomy of the Picrodendraceae

References

The Plant List

External links
 http://indiabiodiversity.org/species/show/266543

Monotypic Malpighiales genera
Picrodendraceae
Flora of India (region)
Trees of Sri Lanka
Flora of the Andaman Islands